Schinia chrysella is a moth of the family Noctuidae. It is found throughout the central United States south to Monterry, Mexico.
[[Image:Schinia chrysella female.JPG|thumb|left|100px|Schinia chrysella female]]

The wingspan is about 23 mm.

The larvae feed on Amphiachyris dracunculoides''.

References

External links
Image on Plate
Bug Guide
Systematics of Schinia chrysellus (Grote) complex: Revised status of Schinia alencis (Harvey) with a description of two new species (Lepidoptera: Noctuidae: Heliothinae)

Schinia
Moths of North America

Taxa named by Augustus Radcliffe Grote
Moths described in 1874